Yakada Pihatu (Iron Feathers) is a 2003 Sri Lankan Sinhala action drama film directed by Udayakantha Warnasuriya and produced by Soma Edirisinghe for EAP Films. It stars Ranjan Ramanayake and Anoja Weerasinghe in lead roles along with Semini Iddamalgoda and Dilhani Ekanayake. Music for the film was composed by Ananda Perera.

The film was shot in Rambukkana, Kegalle Province. It is the 1016th Sri Lankan film in the Sinhala cinema.

Plot
Nadeesha Kulasobana (played by Dilhani Ekanayake) is informed by the police that her fiancé, Romesh Jayawardena (Ranjan Ramanayake), has been hurt in an accident. She gets raped and murdered by three men while trying to visit her fiancé in hospital. After a trial, the three men are freed by the court. Romesh then finds and kills his fiancée's murderers before running away. 

While traveling on a train, Romesh meets Manuja (Anoja Weerasinghe) and her son. They soon become friends and he visits her house in a rural village. Romesh spends his time helping Manuja and the villagers until he is tracked down and caught by the police. He is sentenced to serve time in prison. After he finishes his sentence, he visits the village again and they live happily ever after.

Cast
 Ranjan Ramanayake as Romesh Jayawardena
 Anoja Weerasinghe as Manuja
 Sohan Warnasooriya as Pasindu
 Semini Iddamalgoda as Surangi
 Dilhani Ekanayake as Nadeesha Kulasobana
 D.B. Gangodathennaa as Manuja's mad stepfather
 Wilson Karunaratne as Gal Somey
 Suminda Sirisena as Wilson 'Aiyya'
 Quintus Weerakoon as Hector 'Loku Massina'
 Manike Attanayake as Loku Nena
 Nimal Anthony as Harry 'Mahaththaya'
 Somasiri Alakolange as Police Chief
 Somasiri Colombage as Gramasevaka

References

2003 films
2000s Sinhala-language films
Films set in Sri Lanka (1948–present)
2003 action drama films
Sri Lankan drama films
Films directed by Udayakantha Warnasuriya